Greensborough can refer to:

 Greensborough, Victoria, Australian suburb
 Greensborough, Ontario, neighbourhood in Canada

See also
 Greensboro (disambiguation)